Debra Rae "Debbie" Armstrong (born December 6, 1963) is a former World Cup alpine ski racer from Seattle, Washington. She was the first gold medalist from the U.S. in women's alpine skiing in 12 years, winning the giant slalom at the 1984 Winter Olympics in Sarajevo, Yugoslavia.

Racing career
Born in Salem, Oregon, Armstrong grew up in Seattle and was a multi-sport athlete at Garfield High School; in addition to ski racing, she also played basketball, soccer, volleyball and tennis and has been inducted in the Seattle Public School Hall of Fame and State of Washington Sports Hall of Fame and the U.S. Ski Hall of Fame.

Debbie Armstrong developed her racing skills in the 1970s at the Alpental ski area at Snoqualmie Pass, an hour east of Seattle on I-90. The run "Debbie's Gold" and the "Armstrong's Express" high-speed quad chairlift are named for her.

She was the Junior National Giant Slalom Champion (Squaw Valley) in 1980. After being named to the U.S. Ski Team in 1981 she placed 14th in her first World Cup Giant Slalom in Val d'isere, France starting from bib number 68.

She made the 1982 World Championship team in Austria where she broke a leg in a downhill training run and was unable to compete.

She finished 2nd in the Giant Slalom at the 1983 U.S. Nationals, and placed 3rd in a World Cup Super G and 5th in a Giant Slalom in early January 1984, shortly before the next Olympic games in Sarajevo.

At the 1984 Winter Olympics in Sarajevo, she became the first American woman to win a gold medal in skiing since Barbara Cochran won gold 12 years earlier in 1972 at Sapporo. Taking the silver medal behind her at Jahorina was Sun Valley's Christin Cooper. Later in those games, Phil Mahre and Bill Johnson became the first American men to win Olympic gold in alpine skiing, and Steve Mahre took the silver in the men's slalom behind his twin brother. All five alpine medalists from the U.S. were from the Northwest.

At the 1985 World Championships in Bormio, Italy, Armstrong placed 4th in the giant slalom.

In 1987, Armstrong placed 6th in the FIS Alpine World Championships Super-G. and became the U.S. National Giant Slalom Champion.

She finished 13th in the giant slalom at the 1988 Winter Olympics in Calgary.

Dr. Hubert Armstrong, Armstrong's father, is a clinical psychologist at the University of Washington.  He participated in the 1988 Winter Olympics representing the US luge team as the Sports Psychologist. His 1986, Parenting the Elite Athlete (Armstrong Jr. Ph.D., Hubert E. (February/March 1986) has gained traction as a classic sport parenting article in alpine ski racing.

She completed her World Cup career with 18 top ten finishes: 7 in the downhill, three in the Super-G, five in the giant slalom, and three in the combined.

World Cup results

Season standings

Top ten finishes

World championship results

Olympic results

Post-racing
After her retirement from competitive skiing following the 1988 World Cup season, Armstrong has led various humanitarian causes, including the Debbie Armstrong Say No to Alcohol and Drugs campaign; the SKIFORALL Foundation, which opens skiing events to the disabled; and Global ReLeaf Sarajevo, which seeks to reforest Sarajevo after the Bosnian war. Armstrong moved to Albuquerque, NM and attended University of New Mexico and earned an undergraduate degree (Bachelor of Science) in History.

Armstrong served as the Ski Ambassador at Taos Ski Valley for eight seasons. Simultaneously, she served a four-year term on the Professional Ski Instructors of America (PSIA) Alpine Demo Team which marked the first time a former US Ski Team athlete qualified for the Demo Team.

The PSIA Demo Team (now known as the PSIA-AASI Alpine Team) is made up of the top ski instructors in the nation. These professionals are "some of the best skiers and riders in the game and they are inspirational educators and lifelong learners. Every four years, thirty men and women are chosen to represent the association following a rigorous selection process. Team members are responsible for promoting, supporting, and assisting with the development of PSIA-AASI education materials, programs, and activities at all levels. They set the standard for U.S. snowsports instruction and embody the ski and snowboard experience."

In 2007, Armstrong moved to Steamboat Springs, Colorado where she served one year as Technical Director for the Steamboat Ski Resort (Armstrong 2008, p. 36). In 2008, she became the Alpine Director at the Steamboat Springs Winter Sports Club, a world-renowned ski club located in Steamboat Springs, Colorado, a position she held for six years. Beginning with the 2014 season, Armstrong transitioned to the U10 Head Coach position and Coach Trainer at the Sports Club.

Currently, Armstrong is specializing in the training and development of young skiers (U8-U12) and serves on numerous US Ski and Snowboard Task Forces for Education, Athlete Development and Gender Topics. Armstrong produces specialized training videos for coaches and athletes.

Bibliography
 Armstrong Jr., Ph.D., Hubert E.(February/March, 1986). "Parenting the Elite Athlete", Puget Soundings, p6.
 Armstrong, Deb (September, 1987). "The importance of being an all-around athlete [Athlete Point of View]", American Ski Coach, v11, n1, p38.
 Armstrong, Deb (Fall, 2001). "IMSIA mountain rendezvous 2001: a success of olympic proportions", the professional skier, p44.
 Armstrong, Deb (Winter, 2003). "Turning to tipping and back again: a process of rediscovery", the professional skier, p8.
 Armstrong, Deb (Spring, 2004). "To vary your turn radius, improve your range of lateral motion", the professional skier, p28.
 Armstrong, Deb (Winter, 2005). "Avoid the rainbow rut with new turn tactis", the professional skier, p34.
 Armstrong, Deb (Spring, 2005). "Training for life", the professional skier, p16.
 Armstrong, Deb (Fall, 2005). "My winter with Otto Lang", the professional skier, p28.
 Armstrong, Deb (Winter, 2006). "US Ski Team shares its alpine tactics", the professional skier, p30.
 Armstrong, Deb (Fall, 2006). "Where are you going? A look at directional movement", the professional skier, p26.
 Armstrong, Deb (Spring, 2008). "It's hip to think hips, even if you're a fan of the ankles", the professional skier, p32.

References

External links
 
 Debbie Armstrong World Cup standings at the International Ski Federation
 
 
 
 Sports Illustrated cover 20-Feb-1984
 
 
 About PSIA-AASI Teams
 International Skiing History website - bio of Debbie Armstrong
 Debra Armstrong Training Videos for technical and tactical ski skill development - A primary emphasis is ideas for ski coaches.

Videos
 
 
 
 
 

American female alpine skiers
Alpine skiers at the 1984 Winter Olympics
Alpine skiers at the 1988 Winter Olympics
Sportspeople from Salem, Oregon
Skiers from Seattle
1963 births
Living people
Medalists at the 1984 Winter Olympics
Garfield High School (Seattle) alumni
Olympic gold medalists for the United States in alpine skiing
21st-century American women